Dunamon is a civil parish  in County Galway, Ireland. The principal family in the locality were the Caulfeilds.

References

External links
Dunamon Castle, Geograph
Dunamon Castle, Wikipedia

Civil parishes of County Galway
Townlands of County Galway
Church of Ireland parishes in the Republic of Ireland